The 2010 Philippine Collegiate Championship was the third tournament of the Philippine Collegiate Championship (PCC) for basketball in its current incarnation, and the eighth edition overall. The champion teams from the University Athletic Association of the Philippines (UAAP), National Collegiate Athletic Association (NCAA), the Cebu Schools Athletic Foundation, Inc. (CESAFI) and 3 other Metro Manila leagues took part in the final tournament dubbed as the "Sweet Sixteen". Other teams had to qualify in the zonal tournaments to round out the 16 teams in the tournament.

The defending champions Ateneo Blue Eagles defeated the Adamson Soaring Falcons in the championship to make it back-to-back; the De La Salle Green Archers and the UC Webmasters disputed third place, with La Salle winning.

ABS-CBN Sports was the coverage partner, with games airing on Studio 23.

Tournament format
Top 4 teams from the NCAA, UAAP and the CESAFI finalists qualify automatically to the national quarterfinals.
Fifth to sixth teams from the NCAA and UAAP qualify to the zonal qualifying games.
Champions from regional league qualify to the regional championship.
Best teams from the regional championship qualify for the zonal qualifying games.
Best seven teams from the zonal qualifying games qualify to the national quarterfinals
Teams are seeded 1 to 16th at the national quarterfinals in a single elimination format up to the Finals, which is a best-of-3 format, with a playoff for third.

Qualifying

Automatic qualifiers

Zonal qualifiers

Zonal qualifying

Luzon-MM Interzonals

VisMin Interzonals

Bracket

Finals
The Finals is a best-of-3 series. The team that wins two games first is named the champion.

Awards
The awardees are:
Most Valuable Player: Nico Salva (Ateneo)
Mythical Five:
Nico Salva (Ateneo)
Kirk Long (Ateneo)
Lester Alvarez (Adamson)
Alex Nuyles (Adamson)
June Mar Fajardo (U of Cebu)
Best Coach: Norman Black (Ateneo)
Best Referee: Meynard Bellecer
Special Individual and Team Awards:
National Collegiate Player of the Year: June Mar Fajardo (U of Cebu)
Motivator of the Year Award: Atty. Baldomero Estenzo (U of Cebu)   
Fortitude Award:  National University Bulldogs
Breakthrough Performance Award:  University of Iloilo Wildcats
Grinder Award:  Lyceum Pirates
Comeback Award: De La Salle Green Archers
Great Leap Forward Award:  Adamson Soaring Falcons

Juniors' tournament
This tournament was added only in 2010. The runners-up of the NCAA and UAAP will battle for the third spot while the champion of each league will battle for the top spot.

Battle for third

Championship

External links
Collegiate Champions League official website

2010
2010–11 in Philippine basketball leagues